Flora Irwin Schofield (1873–1960) was an American painter. Her work is included in the collections of the Whitney Museum of American Art and the Provincetown Art Association and Museum.

References

1873 births
1960 deaths
American women painters
20th-century American painters
20th-century American women artists